Patrick Michael Killorin (born June 11, 1944) is a former American football center. A native of Watertown, New York, Killorin played college football for Syracuse and was selected by the Associated Press as the first-team offensive center on the 1964 All-America team. Syracuse coach Ben Schwartzwalder credited Killorin's play with the success of the team's running backs Jim Nance and Floyd Little. He also played for the Pittsburgh Steelers of the National Football League (NFL) in 1966. He appeared in five games for the Steelers.

References

1944 births
Living people
All-American college football players
American football centers
Syracuse Orange football players
Pittsburgh Steelers players
Sportspeople from Watertown, New York
Players of American football from New York (state)